Hemidactylus albopunctatus, also known as the white-spotted gecko or white leaf-toed gecko, is a species of gecko. It is found in eastern Africa in Ethiopia, northern Kenya, and Somalia.

References

Hemidactylus
Reptiles of Ethiopia
Reptiles of Kenya
Reptiles of Somalia
Reptiles described in 1947
Taxa named by Arthur Loveridge